Jasmir bin Mehat (born 6 February 1994 in Malacca) is a Malaysian footballer who plays as an attacking midfielder or also can play as a left winger for Malaysian club Kelantan  in the Malaysia Premier League.

Career statistics

Club

Honours
Melaka United
Malaysia FAM League: 2015
Malaysia Premier League: 2016

Terengganu City
Malaysia FAM League: 2018

References

External links

1994 births
Living people
People from Malacca
Malaysian people of Malay descent
Malaysian footballers
Malaysia Super League players
Association football midfielders
Melaka United F.C. players